USS Vengeance (1779) was a former merchant ship that served under the command of John Paul Jones in the Revolutionary War.

Citations

References
 

United States Navy ship names